The Noah Odell House, also known as the Gilbert Rider House and the Wayside Inn, was a historic building located northeast of Nodaway, Iowa, United States. Odell is credited with building the I-house in 1858. It was significant as the only known example of the heavy frame I-house residential construction type in Adams County. It is also believed that the house served as a stop on a stagecoach route, and it is possible that the house was a stop on the Underground Railroad, or at the very least that Odell was active in assisting runaway slaves. The house was listed on the National Register of Historic Places (NRHP) in 2000. It was subsequent torn down and removed from the NRHP in 2022.

References

Houses completed in 1858
I-houses in Iowa
Underground Railroad in Iowa
Houses on the National Register of Historic Places in Iowa
Buildings and structures in Adams County, Iowa
National Register of Historic Places in Adams County, Iowa
1858 establishments in Iowa